John Talbut (20 October 1940 – 14 August 2020) was an English football defender.

Talbut initially made his name with Burnley, where he came out of the club's youth system and established himself as a first-team regular, also appearing for the England under-23 team whilst at the club. In December 1966 Jimmy Hagan paid £30,000 to take Talbut to West Bromwich Albion and he soon replaced veteran Stan Jones at the heart of Albion's defence. Talbut was a winner with the Baggies in the 1968 FA Cup Final but also featured on the losing side in the 1970 Football League Cup Final. He never scored a league goal for the club but did find the net once against A.S. Roma in the Anglo-Italian Cup in 1970.

Although a strong presence in the air Talbut was at times found wanting on the ground and the arrival of John Wile in late 1970 left him surplus to requirements at the Albion. No longer able to gain a first team spot he left Albion in the 1971 close season to take up the position of player-manager with Belgian second division club KV Mechelen.

Talbut died on 14 August 2020, at the age of 79, due to complications from dementia.

References

1940 births
2020 deaths
English footballers
England under-23 international footballers
Burnley F.C. players
West Bromwich Albion F.C. players
K.V. Mechelen players
Belgian Pro League players
Expatriate footballers in Belgium
English expatriate sportspeople in Belgium
Footballers from Oxford
Association football central defenders
Deaths from dementia in England
FA Cup Final players